Halysidota meridionalis is a moth of the family Erebidae. It was described by Walter Rothschild in 1909. It is found in Mexico.

References

Halysidota
Moths described in 1909